BMHS may refer to:

British Music Hall Society
Barnes and Mortlake History Society
Barrington Municipal High School
Benbrook Middle-High School
Bishop McNamara High School
Bishop Martin High School
Blue Mountain High School
Banting Memorial High School
Bell Multicultural High School
Beloit Memorial High School
Bernice MacNaughton High School
Billerica Memorial High School
Bishop Miege High School
Bishop Montgomery High School
Bishop McCort High School
Bradshaw Mountain High School
Brien McMahon High School
Brother Martin High School
Bohemia Manor High School